Ann Westin, (born 15 February 1956) is a Swedish comedian. She previously worked as a psychiatric nurse and nurse. She made her debut as a comedian at Norra brunn in 1996. She was awarded Bubbenpriset in 2001. She has participated in several television shows such as Stockholm Live and Cirkus Möller. In 2014, she toured with her solo performance Jobbit.

References

External links 

Living people
1956 births
Swedish comedians
People from Gothenburg